Nicola Procaccini (born 21 January 1976 in Rome) is an Italian politician and Member of the European Parliament since 2019.

He served as Mayor of Terracina to 30 May 2011 to 6 May 2015. On 21 June 2016 he was again re-elected Mayor of Terracina.

References

Living people
1976 births
MEPs for Italy 2019–2024
Brothers of Italy MEPs
Brothers of Italy politicians
The People of Freedom politicians
National Alliance (Italy) politicians
Politicians from Rome